Leptogonum is a monotypic genus of plants in the family Polygonaceae endemic to the island of Hispaniola.

References

Polygonaceae genera